Sospeter Mwijarubi Muhongo, FGSAf, FTWAS, FAAS, CGeol, EurGeol, MASSAf, FGIGE, MP (born 25 June 1954) is a Tanzanian geologist and a nominated member of the Tanzanian Parliament.

He served as the Minister of Energy and Minerals from May 2012 until his resignation in January 2015 following the Tegeta escrow scandal. He was succeeded by his deputy George Simbachawene. He won the parliamentary constituency of Musoma Rural in the general election and was thereafter appointed to his former portfolio by President John Magufuli.

Life and career

He was the editor-in-chief of the Journal of African Earth Sciences.

He is a fellow of several highly learned professional societies including the Geological Society of London., the Geological Society of America, the Chinese Academy of Geological Sciences, and the Tanzania Academy of Sciences.

He also is the Vice-President for  Commission of the Geological Map of the World (CGMW), 2005-to date.

Has also worked as a Visiting Researcher, University of Mainz, Germany in 2000–2009

He was the founder and first Executive Director of the International Council for Science (ICSU)- Africa Region. ICSU is a non-governmental organisation with a global membership of national scientific bodies (121 members) and international scientific unions (30 members).

In 2009, he was among the nominated candidates from Tanzania, for the post of Director General for UNESCO.

Honours and awards

Awards
1977: Vice-Chancellor's Prize, University of Dar es Salaam
1979: Gondwana Prize, University of Dar es Salaam
2004: Robert Shackleton Award for Outstanding Precambrian Research in Africa – the flagship award of the Geological Society of Africa. 
2006: National Award for Research in Science and Technology (NARST) by the Tanzania Commission for Science and Technology
2007: The Honours Award of the Geological Society of South Africa.
2011: Ordre des Palmes Académiques (Order of Academic Palms) at Officier (Officer) grade by the French Government

Honorary
University of Pretoria, Honorary Professor of Geology since 2006
Honorary Research Fellow of the Chinese Academy of Geological Sciences (FCAGS)

Publications
Muhongo is the author or co-author of over 150 scientific articles and technical papers and has co-authored the publication of large-scale geological maps of Africa, East Africa and Tanzania.

List of selected publications
Muhongo, S., Gudyanga, F.P., Enow, A.A. and Nyanganyura, D. (Editors), (2009). Science, Technology and Innovation for Socio-Economic Development: Success Stories from Africa, 175 pp, Pretoria, South Africa
Fritz, H., Tenczer, V., Hauzenberger, C., Wallbrecher, E. and Muhongo, S., (2009). Hot granulite nappes – tectonic styles and thermal evolution of Proterozoic Granulite Belt in East Africa. Tectonophysics 477, Issue 3–4, 160–173.
Muhongo, S., (2009). Managing the Future of Planet Earth: The role of knowledge, science, technology and innovation. In: Future of Planet Earth, Seminar Proceedings, Foundation For the Future (FFF)/UNESCO publication, p. 147–153.
P. Pinna, S. Muhongo, et al. (2004) Geology and Mineral Map of Tanzania.  Scale: 1:2.000.000 .  (BRGM-UDSM-GST team)

References

1954 births
Living people
Tanzanian geologists
Chama Cha Mapinduzi MPs
Tanzanian MPs 2010–2015
Tanzanian MPs 2015–2020
Nominated Tanzanian MPs
Tanzanian Roman Catholics
Government ministers of Tanzania
University of Dar es Salaam alumni
University of Göttingen alumni
Technical University of Berlin alumni
Academic staff of the University of Dar es Salaam
Academic staff of the University of Pretoria
Officiers of the Ordre des Palmes Académiques
Fellows of the Geological Society of America
People from Musoma
Fellows of the African Academy of Sciences